

Major national-level parties
 Indian National Congress (INC)
 Bharatiya Janata Party, Sikkim Unit

Major regional parties
 Sikkim Krantikari Morcha (SKM)
 Sikkim Democratic Front (SDF)

Minor national-level parties
 All India Trinamool Congress (AITC)
 Nationalist Congress Party (NCP)

Minor regional parties
 Sikkim Progressive Alliance (SPA)
 Sikkim Sangram Parishad (SSP)
 Sikkim Rajya Manch Party (SRMP) led by Rup Narayan Chamling
 Sikkim National People’s Party (SNPP) led by Delay Namgyal Barfungpa
 Sikkim United Front Party (SUFP) led by Narendra Adhikari
 Hamro Sikkim Party (HSP)
 Organization of Sikkimese Unity (OSU)
 Sikkim Independent Front (SIF)
 Sikkim Gorkha Party (SGP)
 Sikkim Scheduled Caste League (SSCL)
 Sikkim Republican Party (SRP)
 Sikkim National Liberation Front (SNLF)
 Sikkim Gorkha Prajatantrik Party (SGPP)
 Gorkha National Liberation Front (GNLF)

Defunct parties
 Sikkim National Party
 Rajya Praja Sammelan (RPS) {merged with Sikkim National Congress in 1962}
 Sikkim Swatantra Dal (SSD) {merged with Sikkim National Congress in 1962}
 Sikkim State Congress (SSC) {merged with Sikkim Janata Congress in 1972}
 Sikkim Janata Party (SJP) {merged with Sikkim Janata Congress in 1972}
 Sikkim Janata Congress (SJC)  {merged with Sikkim National Congress in 1973}
 Sikkim National Congress (SNC) {merged with Indian National Congress in 1975}
 Sikkim Janata Parishad (SJP) {merged with Indian National Congress in 1982}
 Sikkim Congress (Revolutionary) (SCR)
 Sikkim Himali Congress (SHC)
 Sikkim Prajatantra Congress (SPC)
 Rising Sun Party (RIS)
 Sikkim Ekta Manch (SEM) {merged with Indian National Congress in 1998}
 Sikkim Janashakti Party (SJP) {merged with Indian National Congress in 1999}
 Nepali Bhutia Lepcha (NEBULA) {merged with Trinamool Congress in 2013}
 Sikkim Himali Rajya Parishad (SHRP) {merged with Indian National Congress in 2014}

References 

 
Politics of Sikkim